Richland Grove Township is located in Mercer County, Illinois. As of the 2010 census, its population was 2,300 and it contained 965 housing units.

Geography

Demographics

References

External links
City-data.com
Illinois State Archives

Townships in Mercer County, Illinois
Townships in Illinois